KTUZ-FM (106.7 FM, "La Z") is a Regional Mexican radio station serving the Oklahoma City Metroplex area and is owned by Tyler Media. Tyler Media also owns KTUZ-TV (channel 30), for which the television station was given the radio station's callsign.  The station's studios are located in Northeast Oklahoma City and a transmitter site is located in unincorporated Canadian County.

History
The station began broadcasting in 1968 as KWOE-FM and adopted a country format. It changed calls in 1981 to KKCC-FM and again in June 1990 to KSWR. The station flipped to an oldies format in September 1996 and changed its call letters to KCLI-FM. In late 2000, it moved to Okarche, Oklahoma, in order to serve the Oklahoma City market and adopted the call letters KTUZ-FM. During this time changed to a Regional Mexican format. On May 30, 2018 KTUZ-FM Tower collapsed after a crop duster struck the tower and killing the pilot on board the aircraft. Tyler Media has plans to get KTUZ-FM back on for an auxiliary site while the NTSB and the FAA investigate the plane crash.

External links
KTUZ station website

TUZ-FM
TUZ-FM
Regional Mexican radio stations in the United States